Niagara Falls is an EP by Boxhead Ensemble, released on November 15, 1999 through Atavistic Records.

Track listing

Personnel 
Musicians
Jim Becker
David Grubbs
Ryan Hembrey
Charles Kim
Michael Krassner
Fred Lonberg-Holm
Darren Richard

References 

1999 EPs
Atavistic Records EPs
Boxhead Ensemble albums